Terri Wilder may refer to:

Terri L. Wilder
Terri Hoffman (this page was redirected there because she was once married to a man named Wilder)